Ernesto Cloma Briones Jr., known as Jon Jon Briones (born August 7, 1965), is a Filipino-American actor best known for his work in musical theatre. He was born in Quezon City, Philippines and became a United States citizen in 2010.

Career
While an engineering student in the Philippines, Briones became involved with the original 1989 London production of Miss Saigon. Briones had a friend who was a producer in the Philippines, who asked Briones to help "facilitate an audition" for the Cameron Mackintosh team who were holding auditions in the Philippines for Miss Saigon. In addition to helping with the organization of the auditions, Briones himself auditioned for and then became a member of the ensemble.

He has been involved with various touring productions of Miss Saigon, as a swing and covering other roles, finally playing the Engineer. In 2014 he joined the original cast of the Miss Saigon West End revival, playing the Engineer. He was nominated for the Laurence Olivier Award for Best Actor in a Musical for playing this role and won the Whatsonstage.com Award for Best Actor in a Musical. He remained in the role until the production closed on February 27, 2016.

In 2017, Briones transferred with the production to Broadway at the Broadway Theatre. Previews started on March 1, 2017, with an official opening on March 23.

On April 30, 2019, Briones received the Visionary Award from East West Players during their annual awards dinner and silent auction. The award is given to celebrate individuals that are able to raise the visibility of Asian Pacific Americans through their work. During his acceptance speech, Briones said that his "vision is that we change hearts and minds in Hollywood and in the theatre community so they see that we have a voice and a story – beautiful stories – to tell, and we are the ones who can and should tell it."

In 2018, he appeared in The Assassination of Gianni Versace: American Crime Story as Modesto Cunanan, father of Gianni Versace's murderer, Andrew Cunanan, and in American Horror Story: Apocalypse as Ariel Augustus.

In 2020, Briones appeared in the Netflix drama series Ratched, portraying Dr. Richard Hanover.

In 2022, Briones appeared in the second season of Star Trek: Picard, on which his daughter Isa is a main cast member.

Personal life
In 1996, Briones married Megan Johnson. They have two children: Isa Briones (b. 1999) and Teo Briones (b. 2005). His wife and children are also actors.

Filmography

Film

Television

References

External links
 
 

1965 births
21st-century American male actors
American male musical theatre actors
American people of Filipino descent
Filipino emigrants to the United States
Living people
Male actors from Manila
Theatre World Award winners